Charles Alfred Fletcher (28 October 1905 – 22 August 1980) was an English professional footballer, best remembered for his spells as an outside left in the Football League with Clapton Orient and Brentford.

Career 
An outside left, Fletcher began his career at Clapton Orient and failed trials with Football League clubs Aston Villa and Plymouth Argyle, before signing with Third Division South club Crystal Palace in 1928. He made seven league appearances during the 1928–29 season, before moving to division rivals Merthyr Town in August 1929. Fletcher returned to Clapton Orient, who had by then been relegated to the basement division, in 1930. He became a regular at the Lea Bridge Stadium and scored 32 goals in 120 league matches to earn the nickname "Thunderboots".

In August 1933, Fletcher moved across London to sign for newly promoted Second Division club Brentford in a swap deal for Percy Whipp. He was a virtual ever-present for the Bees during the 1933–34 and 1934–35 seasons and won promotion to the First Division with the club. He fell out with manager Harry Curtis in November 1935 and dropped to the Second Division to sign for Burnley in February 1936 and then Plymouth Argyle in November 1937. Fletcher transferred to Ipswich Town in November 1938 (during the club's debut league season) and remained registered at Portman Road during the Second World War. After the war, Fletcher returned to the now-renamed Leyton Orient in December 1945, but at age 40, he failed to make an appearance.

Personal life 
Fletcher attended Colegrave School and Stratford School in London. Prior to becoming a professional footballer, he worked as a timber grinder. During the Second World War, Fletcher worked as a lorry driver and then as a foreman in a munitions factory.

Honours 
Brentford
Football League Second Division: 1934–35

Career statistics

References

1905 births
1980 deaths
Footballers from the London Borough of Hackney
English footballers
Crystal Palace F.C. players
Merthyr Town F.C. players
Leyton Orient F.C. players
Brentford F.C. players
Burnley F.C. players
Plymouth Argyle F.C. players
Ipswich Town F.C. players
English Football League players
Association football outside forwards